Michaelophorus dentiger is a species of moth in the genus Michaelophorus known from Argentina, Brazil, British Guyana, Cuba, Curaçao, Honduras, Ecuador, Nicaragua, Paraguay, and Venezuela. The host plant for the species is suspected to be Hippomane mancinella.

References

Platyptiliini
Moths described in 1916
Moths of South America